Barney Cohen may refer to:
 Barney Cohen (screenwriter), writer on Forever Knight, Friday the 13th: The Final Chapter, Killer Party and Doom Runners; In the 80's, He was hired by his friend Joseph Zito to re-write Ted Newsom & John Brancato's first draft for Spider-Man and he was an executive consultant on Sabrina, the Teenage Witch.
 Barney Cohen (businessman), founder of Valley Media, Inc. and record label Valley Entertainment

See also
 Barney (disambiguation)
 Cohen (disambiguation)